The Million Hare is a 1963 Warner Bros. Looney Tunes theatrical cartoon short directed by Robert McKimson. The short was released on April 6, 1963, and stars Bugs Bunny and Daffy Duck.

Clips from The Million Hare were used, with color commentary by John Madden and Pat Summerall, as part of the fourth quarter of the 2001 Cartoon Network special The Big Game XXIX: Bugs vs. Daffy.

Plot 
During the opening titles, the song "With Plenty of Money and You" is heard. The camera pans down a stack of TV antennas and enters the underground home of Bugs Bunny, who is being visited by Daffy Duck. As they watch a TV game show called "Beat Your Buddy", an announcer says he will draw two names from the "buddy barrel", and that the first name to reach the television studio will win "a million bucks." He then draws Bugs and Daffy's names.

Bugs and Daffy race each other to the studio. Daffy finds himself continuously hindered, usually due to his own impatience. For example, he drives a moped onto a bridge under construction and winds up in the water below-forgetting that, as a duck, he can already fly and swim.

Bugs, keeping a steady, simple pace, reaches the studio's building first. Daffy dons a jet pack, hoping to beat Bugs to the top floor. He flies to the top floor, grabs Bugs, and zooms out the other end of the building. They land in an antique glass shop and are taken to a hospital. Even though they are in bandages, with Daffy on crutches and Bugs in a wheelchair (yelling "giddy up, mule, ya, ya!"), they continue the race and Daffy crosses the finish line first.

Daffy then discovers that the "million bucks" is actually a "Million BOX"—a huge box filled with one million little boxes. Considering the prize worthless, Daffy gives it to Bugs. The announcer then reveals that "inside each of the one million little boxes, there is a crisp, brand-new $1 bill"—thus Daffy has just given Bugs $1,000,000. "With Plenty of Money and You" is heard again, and the announcer asks Daffy if he wants to say something to the audience. Daffy's head slowly changes into that of a donkey (a "jackass"), and he starts braying.

Home media
"The Million Hare" is available on the Looney Tunes Superstars and The Best of Bugs Bunny DVD’s. However, both releases have the short cropped to widescreen format. This short can also be found in its original aspect ratio on the Bugs Bunny 80th Anniversary Collection Blu-ray set.

See also 
 List of American films of 1963
 List of cartoons featuring Daffy Duck
 List of Bugs Bunny cartoons

References

External links 
 
 

1963 films
1963 animated films
1963 short films
Looney Tunes shorts
Warner Bros. Cartoons animated short films
1963 comedy films
Films directed by Robert McKimson
Bugs Bunny films
Daffy Duck films
Animated films about rabbits and hares
Films scored by William Lava
1960s Warner Bros. animated short films
1960s English-language films